The 1898 Auburn Tigers football team represented Auburn University in the 1898 Southern Intercollegiate Athletic Association football season. It was the Tigers' seventh season and they competed as a member of the Southern Intercollegiate Athletic Association (SIAA). The team was led by head coach John Heisman, in his fourth year, and finished with a record of two wins and one loss (2–1 overall, 2–1 in the SIAA).

Schedule

References

Auburn
Auburn Tigers football seasons
Auburn Tigers football